Glenn Warner is the commonly known name of Floyd Hall Warner (1910, Springfield, Massachusetts1997, Crofton, Maryland), head coach of the Naval Academy's men's soccer team from 1942 to 1975, who led the team to a national title in 1964.

He was president of the National Soccer Coaches Association of America in 1953.

He played on the Springfield College soccer team that was undefeated in the 1931 season.

References 

1910 births
Sportspeople from Springfield, Massachusetts
1997 deaths
American soccer coaches
Springfield College (Massachusetts) alumni
Navy Midshipmen men's soccer coaches
Soccer players from Massachusetts
Association footballers not categorized by position
Association football players not categorized by nationality